The Primavera Sound 2016 was held on 30 May to 5 June 2016 at the Parc del Fòrum, Barcelona, Spain.

The headliners were Radiohead, LCD Soundsystem, Sigur Rós, PJ Harvey, Tame Impala, and The Last Shadow Puppets.

Lineup
Headline performers are listed in boldface. Artists listed from latest to earliest set times.

Heineken

{{Hidden
| headercss = color:#ffffff; background: #1a76a0; font-size: 100%; width: 100%;;
| contentcss = text-align: left; font-size: 100%; width: 100%;;
| header = Heineken headlining set lists
| content =

{{hidden
| headercss = color:#ffffff; background: #1a76a0; font-size: 100%; width: 100%;;
| contentcss = text-align: left; font-size: 100%; width: 100%;;
| header = Radiohead
| content =

"Burn the Witch"
"Daydreaming"
"Decks Dark"
"Desert Island Disk"
"Ful Stop"
"The National Anthem"
"Talk Show Host"
"Lotus Flower"
"No Surprises"
"Pyramid Song"
"The Numbers"
"Karma Police"
"Weird Fishes/Arpeggi"
"Everything in Its Right Place"
"Idioteque"
"Bodysnatchers"
"Street Spirit (Fade Out)"

Encore
"Bloom"
"Paranoid Android"
"Nude"
"2 + 2 = 5"
"There There"

Encore 2
"Creep"
}}

}}

H&M

{{Hidden
| headercss = color:#ffffff; background: #1b663e; font-size: 100%; width: 100%;;
| contentcss = text-align: left; font-size: 100%; width: 100%;;
| header = H&M headlining set lists
| content =

{{hidden
| headercss = color:#ffffff; background: #1b663e; font-size: 100%; width: 100%;;
| contentcss = text-align: left; font-size: 100%; width: 100%;;
| header = The Last Shadow Puppets
| content =

"Miracle Aligner"
"Standing Next to Me"
"Used to Be My Girl"
"The Element of Surprise"
"Aviation"
"Dracula Teeth"
"Calm Like You"
"The Age of the Understatement"
"Everything You've Come to Expect"
"Bad Habits"
"Only the Truth"
"My Mistakes Were Made for You"
"Is This What You Wanted"
"Sweet Dreams, TN"
"In My Room"

Encore
 "I Want You (She's So Heavy)"
"Meeting Place"
}}
{{hidden
| headercss = color:#ffffff; background: #1b663e; font-size: 100%; width: 100%;;
| contentcss = text-align: left; font-size: 100%; width: 100%;;
| header = Sigur Rós
| content =

"Óveður"
"Starálfur"
"Sæglópur"
"Glósóli"
"Vaka"
"Ný batterí"
"E-Bow"
"Festival"
"Yfirborð"
"Kveikur"
"Hafsól"

Encore
 "Popplagið"
}}
}}

Primavera

Ray-Ban

Pitchfork

Adidas Originals

Nightpro

Auditori Rockdelux

Heineken Hidden Stage

Ray-Ban Unplugged

Firestone Stage

Bowers & Wilkins Sound System

Primavera a la Ciutat lineup

Sala Apolo

La [2] de Apolo

Barts

Daypro

Escenario Martini

Sala Teatre

References

2016 music festivals
Music festivals in Spain
Primavera Sound